ARY Celebrity League (ACL) is a Pakistani sports television show where Pakistani celebrities compete with each other in an indoor cricket game format. A Second Season Is Expected To Premiere in 2022.

Teams and squads
The show consists of 5 teams consisting of 6 players (5 males and 1 female).

Match officials

Umpires 

  Aabis Raza
  Nadeem Baig
  Badar Mehmood
  Moshin Mirza

Commentators 

  Aadi Adeel Amjad
  Shafaat Ali
  Hina Ashfaq
  Fahad Mustafa
  Waseem Badami

League stage

Format 
The six teams played 10 matches each and got 2 points for every win, none for a loss and 1 point for a no result. The top four team in the group stage were qualified for the play-offs.

Points table 

 The top 4 teams qualified for the playoffs
  Advanced to Qualifier
  Advanced to Eliminator 1

Fixtures

Playoffs

Eliminator 1

Qualifier

Eliminator 2

References 

2021 Pakistani television series debuts
ARY Digital original programming
Pakistani game shows
Pakistani reality television series
Urdu-language television shows
Cricket on television
Indoor cricket